Sir Venkata Svetachalapathi Ranga Rao Bahadur  (8 September 1862 – 1921) was an Indian landlord and zamindar of Bobbili in Madras Presidency from 1881 to 1921. His grandson and successor Ramakrishna Ranga Rao served as the Chief Minister of Madras Presidency from 1932 to 1936.

Early life 

Venkata Ranga Rao was born at Venkatagiri on November 29, 1862. He was the fourth son of Sarvagnya Krishna Rao Bahadur, the Raja of Venkatagiri. When Venkata Ranga Rao was nine years old, he along with the other younger sons of the family were given away in adoption to the royal houses of Bobbili, Pittapur and Jetprole. Venkata Ranga Rao was adopted by Rani Lakshmi Chellayama of Bobbili. He was tutored by J. Marsh apart from other Indian tutors. He was provided with extensive tutoring in history, economy and Sanskrit.

Marriage 

Venkata Ranga Rao married in 1878. The princess died an untimely death in 1880 after giving birth to their only son Venkata Kumara Krishna Ranga Rao. Venkata Ranga Rao married again, to a younger sister of the princess.

On November 30, 1881, on his attaining majority, Venkata Ranga Rao ascended the throne of Bobbili.

Reign 

Venkata Ranga Rao brought about a number of reforms during his reign as Raja of Bobbili. He raised the Middle School of Bobbili to a high school. He also established a poor schools and those for the physically and mentally handicapped.

In 1883, while Venkata Ranga Rao was on pilgrimage to Kasi, his second wife died in childbirth. This incident followed by the death of his adoptive mother and second son in 1887 had a traumatic effect on him. In 1888, the Raja married for a third time. A third son, Ramakrishna Ranga Rao, was born in 1892.

The Raja constructed the "Raj Mahal" palace in Bobbili in 1888. At that time, there arose a succession dispute between the heirs to the estate of Venkatagiri. Venkata Ranga Rao mediated between the sons of the late Raja and helped in resolving the dispute.

In 1893, Venkata Ranga Rao made a tour of Europe along with his youngest brother Venugopala Ranga Rao. Landing at Marseilles on April 14, 1893, the Raja had audiences with the Duke of York, the Prince of Wales and Queen Victoria. The gratified Raja displayed his loyalty to the British crown by constructing the Victoria Market in 1887 and the Victoria Town Hall in 1894 in honour of the Queen.

In 1902, Venkata Ranga Rao was chosen to represent the Presidency of Madras at the coronation of King Edward VII and Queen Alexandra in London.

Honors 

In 1895, Venkata Ranga Rao was knighted in Ootacamund with the KCIE at a public ceremony presided over by Lord Wenlock, the then Governor of Madras. He was promoted to a GCIE in 1911.

References 

1862 births
Knights Grand Commander of the Order of the Indian Empire
1921 deaths
Telugu people
Indian knights
People from British India
Recipients of the Kaisar-i-Hind Medal
Indian landlords
19th-century landowners
20th-century landowners